The Crow is an American franchise, based on the comic book series of the same name by James O'Barr.

Films
 The Crow (1994)
 The Crow: City of Angels (1996)
 The Crow: Salvation (2000)
 The Crow: Wicked Prayer (2005)
 The Crow (TBA)

Television
 The Crow: Stairway to Heaven (1998–1999)

Unmade Films

The Crow: 2037
Initial development on a third Crow film was announced in August 1997, when it was announced Rob Zombie would be making his directorial debut with The Crow: 2037. White Zombie covered the KC and the Sunshine Band hit "I'm Your Boogie Man" for the soundtrack of The Crow: City of Angels, and after seeing Rob Zombie's work on the video he produced for the song, Edward Pressman offered Zombie the opportunity to helm the third Crow film. Had the film been made, Zombie planned to shift focus in tone from the revenge angle of the previous two entries, to a more horror based approach. The film would've began in 2010, when a young boy and his mother are murdered on Halloween night by a Satanic priest. A year later, the boy is resurrected as the Crow. Twenty-seven years later, and unaware of his past, he has become a bounty hunter on a collision course with his now all-powerful killer.

The Crow: Lazarus
In July 2000, rapper DMX had been in discussions with producers about a fourth Crow film titled The Crow: Lazarus about a rapper who chooses to leave the music scene for the love of a woman and is killed during a drive-by shooting. The rapper is then reincarnated as The Crow in order to take revenge on the gang responsible for his death. Production had been slated to begin in November of that year, but the project ultimately never came to be.

Cast

Crew

Reception

Box office performance

Critical response

References

Film series introduced in 1994
Film franchises
The Crow
Miramax franchises
Dimension Films films
Paramount Pictures franchises